The Clock Store is a Silly Symphonies animated Disney short film. It was released in 1931.

Plot
The various clocks and watches in a clock store dance, ring alarms musically, and otherwise entertain the audience in an after hours presentation.

Reception
Variety (November 17, 1931, as "The Clock Shop"): "Familiar idea of clocks and figures gyrating to musical rhythm. Done before and under the same name if memory recalls, but with live figures instead of cartoon. Here as a cartoon offering a pleasant novelty filler for any program, although not hilariously so."

Home media
The short was released on December 19, 2006, on Walt Disney Treasures: More Silly Symphonies, Volume Two.

References

External links
 

American animated short films
1931 short films
1930s Disney animated short films
Films directed by Wilfred Jackson
Films produced by Walt Disney
Silly Symphonies
1931 animated films
1931 films
Films scored by Frank Churchill
American black-and-white films
Columbia Pictures animated short films
Columbia Pictures short films
Animated films without speech
1930s American films